Khmelevets is a rural locality (a selo) in Valuysky District, Belgorod Oblast, Russia. The population was 266 as of 2010. There are 16 streets.

Geography 
Khmelevets is located 23 km north of Valuyki (the district's administrative centre) by road. Foshchevatovo is the nearest rural locality.

References 

Rural localities in Valuysky District